This is a list of the main career statistics of Russian professional tennis player Nadia Petrova.

Performance timelines
Only main-draw results in WTA Tour, Grand Slam tournaments, Fed Cup and Olympic Games are included in win–loss records.

Singles

Doubles

Significant finals

Grand Slam finals

Doubles: 2 (2 runners-up)

WTA Finals finals

Doubles: 2 (2 titles)

WTA Premier Mandatory & 5 finals

Singles: 5 (3 titles, 2 runners-up)

Doubles: 19 (9 titles, 10 runners-up)

Olympics

Doubles: 1 Bronze Medal Match (1–0)

WTA career finals

Singles: 24 (13 titles, 11 runners-up)

Doubles: 48 (24 titles, 24 runner–ups)

ITF junior results

Singles: 11 (7 titles, 4 runner–ups)

Doubles: 5 (3 titles, 2 runner–ups)

WTA Tour career earnings
Petrova earned more than 12 million dollars during her career.

Head-to-head record against other players

No. 1 wins

Record against top 10 players
Players who have been ranked World No. 1 are in boldface.

 Elena Dementieva 7–8
 Patty Schnyder 7–8
 Li Na 6–1
 Samantha Stosur 6–4
Dinara Safina 5-2
 Vera Zvonareva 5–3
Ana Ivanovic 5–9
 Daniela Hantuchová 4–3
Amélie Mauresmo 4–6
 Nicole Vaidišová 3–1
 Ai Sugiyama 3–2
Serena Williams 3–7
 Elena Vesnina 2-0
 Magdalena Maleeva 2–0
 Alicia Molik 2–1
 Conchita Martínez 2–2
 Amanda Coetzer 2–2
 Mary Pierce 2–2
 Paola Suárez 2–2
 Agnieszka Radwańska 2–3
 Anastasia Myskina 2–3
Victoria Azarenka 2–4
 Francesca Schiavone 2–4
Caroline Wozniacki 2–5
 Svetlana Kuznetsova 2–6
Jelena Janković 2–7
Justine Henin 2–14
Martina Hingis 1–2
 Kimiko Date-Krumm 1–2
 Marion Bartoli 1–2
 Sara Errani 1-2
Venus Williams 1–4
Kim Clijsters 1–4
 Flavia Pennetta 1–5
Maria Sharapova 1–9
 Anna Kournikova 0–1
 Jelena Dokić 0–2
 Petra Kvitová 0–2
 Anna Chakvetadze 0–5
Lindsay Davenport 0–7

Top 10 wins

Notes

External links
 
 
 

Petrova, Nadia